The 1998 Winter Olympics, officially known as the XVIII Olympic Winter Games, was a winter multi-sport event held in Nagano, Japan, from 7 to 22 February 1998. Twenty-four nations earned medals at these Games, and fifteen won at least one gold medal; forty-eight countries left the Olympics without winning a medal. Competitors from Germany earned the highest number of gold medals (12) and the most overall medals (29). With 10 gold medals and 25 overall medals, Norway finished second in both categories. Denmark won its first – and as of 2018 only – Winter Olympics medal, while Bulgaria and the Czech Republic won their first Winter Games gold medals. Azerbaijan, Kenya, Macedonia, Uruguay, and Venezuela competed for the first time, but none of them won a medal.

Varying statistics are reported for the number of participants at the 1998 Winter Olympics. The Sports-Reference website states that 2,180 athletes from 72 nations participated in 68 events from 14 sports and disciplines. Olympic historian Bill Mallon, in his Historical Dictionary of the Olympic Movement, agrees with the figure of 2,180 participants. In contrast, the International Olympic Committee (IOC) website reports that 2,176 athletes competed at the Games. The sport of curling returned after a single appearance in the 1924 Olympics, snowboarding was added as a new sport, and women's ice hockey made its first appearance in the Olympics. 

The leading medal winner at the Games was Russian skier Larisa Lazutina, who won five medals, including three golds. The only other athlete to win three gold medals was Norwegian skier Bjørn Dæhlie, who won four medals overall, making him the first Winter Olympian to win twelve career medals, eight of which were gold. Nine other athletes won three medals, including three Germans. American figure skater Tara Lipinski became the youngest competitor in Winter Olympics history to earn a gold medal in an individual event.

Medal table

The medal table is based on information provided by the IOC and is consistent with IOC convention in its published medal tables. By default, the table is ordered by the number of gold medals the athletes from a nation have won; a nation is an entity represented by a National Olympic Committee. The number of silver medals is taken into consideration next and then the number of bronze medals. If nations are still tied, equal ranking is given and they are listed alphabetically.

In the two-man bobsleigh competition, a tie meant that two gold medals were awarded, so no silver medal was awarded for that event. A tie for second in the men's Super G skiing competition meant that a pair of silver medals were given out, so no bronze medal was awarded for that event. In the four-man bobsleigh, a tie for third resulted in the awarding of two bronze medals. Due to these ties, the number of gold medals awarded was one more than the number of silver or bronze medals. In snowboarding, Canadian Ross Rebagliati won the gold medal in the men's Giant Slalom, but it was briefly stripped by the IOC after he tested positive for marijuana. After the Canadian Olympic Association filed an appeal, however, the IOC's decision was overturned.

References
General
 
 
 
 

Specific

External links
 
 
 

Medal count
1998